The 2008–09 season was Dinamo București's 60th consecutive season in Liga I. In this season, Dinamo competed in Liga I, Cupa României and UEFA Cup.

In the summer of 2008, Mircea Rednic returned as coach having the mission to win the title and qualify Dinamo to the UEFA Champions League Group Stage. The first half of the season found Dinamo playing some modest games against the other title contenders like Rapid Bucharest, CFR Cluj or Unirea Urziceni but in the same time they managed to beat direct rivals for the title, FC Timişoara 3–0 away. Dinamo ended the first half of the season in first place after Unirea Urziceni lost the last game against Steaua Bucharest.

The second half of the season started in a promising way for the Red Dogs. Dinamo managed to beat Rapid with 3–0 at home even though Rapid was considered to be in top form and later eliminated them from the Cup with a similar 4–2 victory in Piteşti. The last three games of the season were against Unirea Urziceni away, FC Brașov home and FC Argeş away and were 3 defeats in a row, sending the club in third position.

Transfers

In

Out

Results

Europe 

UEFA Cup First round

Nijmegen won 1–0 on aggregate.

Squad 

Goalkeepers: Emilian Dolha (5/0), Bogdan Lobonţ (25/0), Florin Matache (4/0)

Defenders: George Blay (17/0), Zie Diabaté (8/0), Lucian Goian (20/0), Dragoş Grigore (2/0), Sergiu Homei (10/0), Silviu Izvoranu (17/0), Júlio César (10/0), Cosmin Moţi (21/0), Nicolae Muşat (1/0), Cristian Pulhac (10/0), Adrian Scarlatache (12/0), Bruno Simão (10/0), Gabriel Tamaş (22/0)

Midfielders: Anoh Attoukora (1/0), Papa Malick Ba (9/0), Gabriel Boştină (26/0), Gualberto Campos (2/0), Adrian Cristea (32/4), Mourtala Diakité (6/0), Nicolae Mitea (12/0), Ousmane N'Doye (12/3), Adrian Ropotan (15/0), Thiago (6/0), Gabriel Torje (30/3), Vojislav Vranjković (4/0), Zé Kalanga (10/0)

Forwards: Florin Bratu (10/7), Andrei Cristea (8/2), Ionel Dănciulescu (34/12), Jean-Philippe Mendy (1/0), Osvaldo Miranda (16/2), Marius Niculae (24/12), Claudiu Niculescu (14/5), Ianis Zicu (9/3)

References 
 www.labtof.ro
 www.romaniansoccer.ro
 www.worldfootball.net

FC Dinamo București seasons
Dinamo Bucuresti